Kuehneosuchus is an extinct genus of Late Triassic kuehneosaurid reptile known from the Late Triassic (Norian stage) of southwest England. It was named by P. L. Robinson in 1967 and the type and only species is Kuehneosuchus latissimus. It is known from the holotype NHMUK PV R 6111, a set of associated vertebrae and ribs. It is a derived kuehneosaurid, most closely related to Kuehneosaurus. The genera are very similar and can be distinguished from one another primarily on the length of their "wing" ribs, relatively short and massive in Kuehneosaurus but up to 4 times longer and more gracile in Kuehneosuchus. However, the skull and major postcranial bones are identical in both taxa, as their age and horizon. According to aerodynamic studies Kuehneosuchus, unlike Kuehneosaurus which may be a species of the same genus or represent a different sexual morph, was probably a glider.

References

Fossil taxa described in 1967
Triassic lepidosauromorphs
Fossils of England
Triassic England
Prehistoric reptile genera